(Gobi-Sümber) is one of the 21 aimags (provinces) of Mongolia. It is located in the center of the country. Its capital is Choir. Govisümber is the least populated Mongolian aimag.

History 

Borjigon clan said in The Secret History of the Mongols: one of the world's greatest cultural and historical written relics  was written in 1240—the year of white mouse. Genghis Khan is a grandson of the Bodanchar who is the heir of the Burte Chono. It is stated in the historical literature that Bodanchar had separated from his brothers and founded the Borjigon clan.

In 1691, when the Manchurian emperior Enkh-Amgalan made Mongolia its tributary state and divided four Mongolian aimags and seven khoshuus, there was founded Borjigon khoshuu of Setsen khan aimag.

In 1911, the name of the khoshuu was changed to Borjigon Setsen van khoshuu.

In 1923, the name was changed to Otsol Sansar uuliin khoshuu.

From 1931 onward, it was called Govisumber soum of the Töv aimag, Sumber soum of the Dornogovi aimag.

From 1991 onward, it was called Choir City.

From 1994 onward, it is called Govisumber aimag.

Administrative subdivisions

References

External links

 
Provinces of Mongolia
States and territories established in 1994
1994 establishments in Mongolia